Will Reid Wilson, Sr. (July 29, 1912 – December 14, 2005), was an American politician and lawyer who served as attorney general of Texas from 1957-1963.

Career 
Wilson was a senior partner in a Dallas law firm and also served as a Texas state Supreme Court justice, and Texas attorney general. He was head of the Criminal Justice Division of the U.S. Department of Justice in the Nixon administration.

Role in Nixon Use of Justice Department Against Political Enemies 
Wilson was appointed by Attorney General John Mitchell in 1970 to supervise the Internal Revenue Service investigation into the tax returns of Alabama Gov. George Wallace, the governor's brother, Gerald Wallace, and financial supporters who had done business with the state of Alabama. Dubbed the Alabama Project by Mitchell, the oversight was a result of President Richard Nixon's keen interest in pressing for eventual indictment of George Wallace prior to the 1972 presidential election. (Wilson in 1970 had provided U.S. Rep. Gerald Ford with derogatory information about Supreme Court Justice William O. Douglas in an effort to impeach or otherwise force Douglas to retire; Nixon had suggested to Wilson that he might be nominated to the court.) Shortly after Wallace decided to drop a third-party bid for president and focus on the Democratic nomination, the Nixon administration decided not to pursue the criminal case.

Wilson was forced out of the Nixon administration after he became embroiled in a Texas stock scandal.

References

1912 births
2005 deaths
Politicians from Austin, Texas
Politicians from Dallas
University of Oklahoma alumni
Southern Methodist University alumni
Burials at Texas State Cemetery
Texas Attorneys General
Justices of the Texas Supreme Court
County district attorneys in Texas
Ranchers from Texas
Texas Democrats
Texas Republicans
United States Army personnel of World War II
United States Army officers
20th-century American non-fiction writers
20th-century American judges
20th-century American male writers
Military personnel from Texas